Perfluorooctanesulfonic acid (PFOS) (conjugate base perfluorooctanesulfonate) is a chemical compound having an eight-carbon fluorocarbon chain and a sulfonic acid functional group and thus a perfluorosulfonic acid. It is an anthropogenic (man-made) fluorosurfactant, now regarded as a global pollutant. PFOS was the key ingredient in Scotchgard, a fabric protector made by 3M, and related stain repellents. The acronym "PFOS" refers to the parent sulfonic acid and to various salts of perfluorooctanesulfonate. These are all colorless or white, water soluble solids. Although of low acute toxicity, PFOS has attracted much attention for its pervasiveness and environmental impact. It was added to Annex B of the Stockholm Convention on Persistent Organic Pollutants in May 2009.

History
In 1949, 3M began producing PFOS-based compounds by electrochemical fluorination resulting in the synthetic precursor perfluorooctanesulfonyl fluoride. In 1968, organofluorine content was detected in the blood serum of consumers, and in 1976 it was suggested to be perfluorooctanoic acid (PFOA) or a related compound such as PFOS. In 1997, 3M detected PFOS in blood from global blood banks, although the company's internal documents indicate knowledge of this decades earlier, dating from the 1970s. In 1999, the U.S. Environmental Protection Agency began investigating perfluorinated compounds after receiving data on the global distribution and toxicity of PFOS, the key ingredient in Scotchgard. For these reasons, and USEPA pressure, the primary American producer of PFOS, 3M, announced, in May 2000, the phaseout of the production of PFOS, PFOA, and PFOS-related products. PFOS and PFOS-related chemicals are currently produced in China.

Chemistry

The main method used for the industrial scale production of PFOS is electrochemical fluorination (ECF). ECF is an electrolysis production method where a precursor of perfluorooctanesulfonyl fluoride is dispersed in a solution of hydrogen fluoride and electrolyzed. This production method, whilst economic and mainly results in PFOS, also results in shorter chain perfluoroalkyl substances being formed. PFOS predominates in the resultant mixture, however, if the reaction is allowed to continue this begins to favor the production of shorter chain PFAS. A distinct isomer ratio has been observed in PFOS produced by ECF, in the order of 70% linear PFOS, 25% branched and 5% terminal; this is not a function of the production process but rather that the precursor also exhibits this isomer ratio. ECF was the means by which 3M produced PFOS up until May 2000 when the company announced a phaseout of fluorosurfactants.

89 constitutional isomers of PFOS are theoretically possible, environmental samples usually contain a mixture of the linear isomer and 10 branched isomers.

Telomerisation involves constructing the PFOS molecule using short chain (often 2-carbon) precursors and adding a sulfonate group as a final step. This production process results in 100% linear PFOS. This production method, whilst cleaner and resulting in a much more pure product than ECF, is not known to have been widely used except for the production of reagent grade PFOS and analytical standards.

Indirect routes
Perfluorooctylsulfonyl compounds degrade to PFOS. Examples include N-methyl perfluorooctane sulfonamidoethanol (N-MeFOSE), a carpet stain repellent, and N-ethyl perfluorooctane sulfonamidoethanol (N-EtFOSE), a paper treatment. Also perfluorooctanesulfonamide is a precursor. About 50 precursors were named in the 2004 proposed Canadian ban on PFOS.

Degradation
PFOS does virtually not degrade under environmental conditions and is thus highly persistent. Waste water treatment plants are also unable to degrade PFOS. On the other hand, precursors are transformed to PFOS in waste water treatment plants.

Properties
The C8F17 subunit of PFOS is hydrophobic and lipophobic, like other fluorocarbons, while the sulfonic acid/sulfonate group adds polarity. PFOS is an exceptionally stable compound in industrial applications and in the environment because of the effect of aggregate carbon–fluorine bonds. PFOS is a fluorosurfactant that lowers the surface tension of water more than that of hydrocarbon surfactants.

Uses
Perfluorooctanesulfonic acid is usually used as the sodium or potassium salts.

 PFOS was the key ingredient in Scotchgard, a fabric protector made by 3M, and numerous stain repellents.
 PFOS, together with PFOA, has also been used to make aqueous film forming foam (AFFF), a component of fire-fighting foams, and alcohol-type concentrate foams.
 PFOS compounds can also be found in some impregnation agents for textiles, paper, and leather; in wax, polishes, paints, varnishes, and cleaning products for general use; in metal surfaces, and carpets.
 In the semiconductor industry, PFOS is used in multiple photolithographic chemicals including: photoacid generators (PAGs) and anti-reflective coatings (ARCs).  It has been phased out in the European Union semiconductor industry due to health concerns.
 PFOS is the key ingredient in Skydrol, a fire-resistant hydraulic fluid used in commercial aviation.

The most important emission sources of PFOS are metal plating and fire-fighting foams. Because of concerns about PFOS, F-53B has been used as a replacement for mist suppression in metal plating.

Levels in humans
Because of its chemical nature, PFOS will remain in the body for several years. It is estimated that it takes 4 years for half of this substance to be eliminated from the body.

PFOS is detected in the blood serum of almost all people in the U.S., but concentrations have been decreasing over time. In contrast, PFOS blood levels appear to be rising in China where PFOS production continues. In people, the highest exposures to PFOS in blood have been 12,830 parts per billion for occupational exposure and 656 parts per billion—or possibly 1,656 parts per billion—in a consumer.  Occupationally exposed individuals may have an average level of PFOS over 1000 parts per billion, and a small segment of individuals in the upper range of the general population may be over the 91.5 parts per billion level.

PFOS exposure has been demonstrated as early as fetal development during pregnancy since PFOS can easily pass through the placenta. It has been shown that fetal exposure to PFOS is quite prevalent and has been shown to be detected in greater than 99% of umbilical cord serum samples.

PFOS has been detected in U.S. freshwater fish, as well as in municipal wastewater and drinking water samples, worldwide, at concentrations ranging between few ng/L and some μg/L.

Levels in wildlife
A variety of wildlife species have had PFOS levels measured in egg, liver, kidney, serum, and plasma samples and some of the highest recorded values as of January 2006 are listed below.

Despite the global wide-ranging restriction, PFOS concentrations in air continued to increase at many monitoring stations between 2009 and 2017.

Health effects in humans and wildlife
There has been a growing body of evidence investigating the health effects of PFOS on the reproductive, developmental, liver, kidney, thyroid, and immunological effects in humans.

Pregnancy outcomes 
Several studies have focused on pregnancy outcomes in infants and mothers who are exposed to PFOS during pregnancy. For developing offspring, exposure to PFOS occurs through the placenta. While the impact of PFOS compounds on fetal development continues to be an ongoing investigation, findings have demonstrated a relationship between PFOS exposure in pregnant mothers and negative birth outcomes.

There has been some evidence to suggest that PFOS levels in pregnant women have been associated with preeclampsia, preterm labor, low birth weight and gestational diabetes. Although, the strongest association is between PFOS levels with preterm birth and preeclampsia. There has been some evidence to suggest that PFOS impairs fetal growth during pregnancy, although findings have been inconsistent.

The specific physiological mechanisms behind adverse pregnancy outcomes with PFOS exposure remain unclear. One proposed cause has to do with PFOS impairment on placental blood flow. This mechanism could help explain several of the pregnancy-related outcomes from PFOS exposure including such as intrauterine growth development, low birth weight, preterm birth labor, and preeclampsia. Additional physiological mechanisms may include disruption in inflammatory signals during pregnancy, decreased trophoblast signaling and trophoblast migration. Additionally, PFOS exposure has been shown to be related to the downregulation genes corresponding to growth factors, pregnancy-related signal transducers, and maternal hormones. PFOS impact on thyroid hormone regulation also has the potential to impact several birth outcomes.

Breastfeeding and lactation 
PFOS has been measured in breastmilk and is estimated to contribute the greatest level of PFOS exposure in infants. Specifically, the duration of breastfeeding has been shown to be associated with increases in PFOS in infants. Some evidence has shown that breastmilk provides more than 94% of the PFOS exposure in infants up to six months old. The Agency for Toxic Substances and Disease Registry (ATSDR) concluded that breastfeeding benefits continue to outweigh potential risks associated with PFOS in breastmilk.

Infertility 
PFAS compounds such as PFOS act as an endocrine disruptor of the reproductive system. As such, there is concern over the impact of this compound on fertility. There is some evidence to suggest that PFOS may impair fertility in both females and males. One study found that women with higher levels of PFOS and PFOA took longer to become pregnant than those with lower levels, suggesting that the chemicals may impair fertility. The impact of PFOS on male fertility is still under investigation. There have been some studies that demonstrated that PFOS is associated with a decrease in sperm count and as well as a decrease in the number of morphologically normal sperm. There has also been evidence to suggest that PFOS may also reduce testosterone levels.

Thyroid disease 
Increased levels of PFOS have been shown to accumulate in thyroid gland cells and have been associated with altered thyroid hormone levels in adults. Appropriate levels of thyroid hormone during pregnancy are critical for a developing fetus as this hormone is involved with brain development and body growth. Studies have demonstrated a relationship between PFOS exposure and thyroid dysfunction during pregnancy resulting in altered thyroid hormone levels in both the mother and the fetus.

Hypercholesterolemia 
PFOS has been associated with increased risk of abnormal levels of cholesterol. Specifically, epidemiological studies in humans have reported an association between increased PFOS levels and the total cholesterol and low density lipoprotein (LDL) cholesterol.

ADHD 
Levels of PFOS in US children aged 12–15 were associated with an increased risk (60% over the interquartile range) of attention deficit hyperactivity disorder (ADHD). The importance of exposure timing during development is unclear, however, some evidence has shown that exposure to PFOS during fetal development was not associated with an increased risk for developing of ADHD later in childhood.

Chronic kidney disease 
Serum levels of PFOS were found to be associated with increased risk of chronic kidney disease in the general US population. "This association was independent of confounders such as age, sex, race/ethnicity, body mass index, diabetes, hypertension, and serum cholesterol level." According to a 2002 study by the Environmental Directorate of the OECD, "PFOS is persistent, bioaccumulative, and toxic to mammalian species."

Cancer 
Research demonstrating the association between PFOS and cancer is still ongoing. A few studies have demonstrated an elevated risk for prostate and bladder cancer, however, there were notable limitations in the design and analysis of these studies. PFOA, another long-chain PFAS compound, has been classified as "possibly carcinogenic to humans" (class 2b) by the International Agency for Research on Cancer (IARC) based on evidence demonstrating an association with testicular and kidney cancer. The Division of Cancer Epidemiology & Genetics (DCEG) is currently investigating the association of several PFAS compounds and cancers including kidney cancer, testicular cancer, prostate cancer, ovarian and endometrial cancer, thyroid cancer, non-hodgkins lymphoma, and childhood leukemia.

In wildlife 
The levels observed in wild animals are considered sufficient to "alter health parameters".

PFOS affects the immune system of male mice at a blood serum concentration of 91.5 parts per billion, raising the possibility that highly exposed people and wildlife are immunocompromised. Chicken eggs dosed at 1 milligram per kilogram (or 1 part per million) of egg weight developed into juvenile chickens with an average of ~150 parts per billion in blood serum—and showed brain asymmetry and decreased immunoglobulin levels.

Regulation

Globally
It was added to Annex B of the Stockholm Convention on Persistent Organic Pollutants in May 2009. Originally, parties agreed on acceptable proposes (time-unlimited exemptions) for the following uses—in addition to a range of specific exemptions (time-limited):
 Photo-imaging
 Photo-resist and anti-reflective coatings for semi-conductors
 Etching agent for compound semi-conductors and ceramic filters
 Aviation hydraulic fluids
 Metal plating (hard metal plating) only in closed-loop systems
 Certain medical devices (such as ethylene tetrafluoroethylene copolymer (ETFE) layers and radio-opaque ETFE production, in-vitro diagnostic medical devices, and CCD colour filters)
 Fire-fighting foam
 Insect baits for control of leaf-cutting ants from Atta spp. and Acromyrmex spp.

In 2019, it was decided to only keep one acceptable purpose:
 Insect baits with sulfluramid (CAS No. 4151-50-2) as an active ingredient for control of leaf-cutting ants from Atta spp. and Acromyrmex spp. for agricultural use only

Canada
In 2008 Canada proposed a ban on PFOS, only the second chemical proposed for a complete ban under the Canadian Environmental Protection Act.

Europe
Based on an OECD study on PFOS and a risk assessment by Europe's Scientific Committee on Health and Environmental Risks the European Union practically banned the use of PFOS in finished and semi-finished products in 2006 (maximum content of PFOS: 0.005% by weight). However, PFOS use for industrial applications (e.g. photolithography, mist suppressants for hard chromium plating, hydraulic fluids for aviation) was exempted.
In 2009 this directive was incorporated into the REACH regulation. In the summer of 2010 PFOS was added to the regulation on persistent organic pollutants and the threshold was lowered to max. 0.001% by weight (10 mg/kg).

United States
In 2018 the State of Michigan established a legally enforceable groundwater cleanup level of 70 ppt for both PFOA and PFOS.

In 2020 the Michigan Department of Environment, Great Lakes, and Energy (EGLE) adopted stricter drinking water standards in the form of maximum contaminant levels (MCLs), lowering acceptable levels from the 2018 enforceable groundwater cleanup levels of 70 ppt to 8 ppt for PFOA and 16 ppt for PFOS and adding MCLs for 5 previously unregulated PFAS compounds PFNA, PFHxA, PFHxS, PFBS, and HFPO-DA.

In 2020, a California bill was passed banning PFOS and the following salts as an intentionally added ingredient from cosmetics: ammonium perfluorooctane sulfonate, diethanolamine perfluorooctane sulfonate, lithium perfluorooctane sulfonate and potassium perfluorooctane sulfonate.

In March 2021 the U.S. EPA announced that it will develop national drinking water standards for PFOA and PFOS.

In October 2021 the EPA proposed to designate PFOA and PFOS as hazardous substances in its PFAS Strategic Roadmap. In September 2022 the EPA proposed to designate as hazardous substances under the Superfund Comprehensive Environmental Response, Compensation, and Liability Act of 1980 (CERCLA).

See also
2005 Hertfordshire Oil Storage Terminal fire
Fluorocarbons
Per- and polyfluoroalkyl substances
Timeline of events related to per- and polyfluoroalkyl substances

References

External links

Mason Chemical Company, Fluorosurfactant Structure/Function page
PFOS risk assessment report
Centers for Disease Control and Prevention, Polyfluorochemicals fact sheet
Perfluorinated substances and their uses in Sweden
Chain of Contamination: The Food Link, Perfluorinated Chemicals (PFCs) Incl. PFOS & PFOA
Provisional evaluation of PFT in drinking water with the guide substances perfluorooctanoic acid (PFOA) and perfluorooctane sulfonate (PFOS) as examples

Anionic surfactants
Persistent organic pollutants under the Stockholm Convention
Endocrine disruptors
Perfluorosulfonic acids